The archery competition at the 2010 Commonwealth Games was held at the Yamuna Sports Complex between 4 and 10 October. This was the second games appearance of the optional Commonwealth Games sport, almost thirty years after its debut at the 1982 Commonwealth Games. Twenty-three nations entered archers into the tournament.

Medal table

Events
Archery at the Commonwealth Games is target archery, where competitors shoot arrows at outdoor targets at marked distances. Eight events are included: four each for women and men, with separate events for recurve and compound bows. The events are:

Men

Women

Venues
Yamuna Sports Complex

Participating nations

See also
 2010 Commonwealth Games

References

External links
 Schedule

 
2010 Commonwealth Games events
2010 in archery
Archery at the Commonwealth Games